This is a list of members of the South Australian Legislative Council from 1962 to 1965.

 LCL MLC Alexander Melrose died on 6 September 1962. Les Hart was elected to fill the vacancy on 20 October.
 LCL MLC Allan Hookings died on 31 October 1962. Ren DeGaris was elected to fill the vacancy on 15 December.
 LCL MLC Geoffrey Giles resigned on 13 May 1964. Henry Kemp was elected to fill the vacancy on 19 June.
 Labor MLC Ken Bardolph died on 9 November 1964. The vacancy was not filled before the March 1965 election.

References
Parliament of South Australia — Statistical Record of the Legislature

Members of South Australian parliaments by term
20th-century Australian politicians